Towards Equality was the title of the report of the Committee on the Status of Women in India (1974–1975). This 1974 document is said to lay the foundation of women's movement in independent India, highlighting discriminatory sociocultural practices, political and economic processes. The findings of the report reopened the women's question for government, academia and women's organisation. Its authors included Vina Mazumdar and Lotika Sarkar, who later founded the Centre for Women’s Development Studies in Delhi.

The report proved to be an "eye opener" for women's condition by talking about development and democracy from gender perspective. It brought to the forefront the issues of declining sex ratio (missing women). It led to women-sensitive policy-making in India and stress on girls' education.

References

Feminism in India
Reports of the Indian government